Pruniers-en-Sologne (literally Pruniers in Sologne) is a commune and town in the Loir-et-Cher department in the administrative region of Centre-Val de Loire, France.

Population

See also

 Communes of the Loir-et-Cher department
 Romorantin - Pruniers Air Detachment

References

Communes of Loir-et-Cher